Ulysses Adolph Redd (November 13, 1914 – November 17, 2002), nicknamed "Hickey", was an American Negro league shortstop for the Birmingham Black Barons in 1940 and 1941.

A native of Baton Rouge, Louisiana, Redd served in the US Army during World War II. He played for the Harlem Globetrotters in 1947. Redd died in Baton Rouge in 2002 at age 88.

References

External links
 and Seamheads
 Ulysses Redd at Negro Leagues Baseball Museum

1914 births
2002 deaths
Birmingham Black Barons players
Harlem Globetrotters players
20th-century African-American sportspeople
Baseball infielders
21st-century African-American people